is Thelma Aoyama's ninth single. It was released on March 3, 2010 by Universal J. "Kaeru Basho" was written by SoulJa who collaborated with her on their number-one song "Soba ni Iru ne". The song was used as the theme song for Doraemon: Nobita's Great Battle of the Mermaid King. The single peaked at number 63 and charted for three weeks.

Track listing

References

2010 singles
Thelma Aoyama songs
Songs written by SoulJa
Japanese film songs
Songs written for animated films
2010 songs
Universal J singles